The 1801 English cricket season was the 30th in which matches have been awarded retrospective first-class cricket status and the 15th after the foundation of the Marylebone Cricket Club. The season saw three top-class matches played in the country.

Thomas Boxall published the earliest known instructional book on cricket called Rules and Instructions for Playing at the Game of Cricket etc..

Matches 
Only three top-class matches were played during the season, all of them staged at Lord's Old Ground. Two matches saw an England XI play Surrey sides. The other match was played between sides assembled by Thomas Mellish and W Turner.

Debutants
1801 debutants included:
 Henry Burrows
 William Lambert
 Thomas Onslow

References

Further reading
 Altham HS (1962) A History of Cricket, Volume 1 London: George Allen & Unwin.
 Birley D (1999)  A Social History of English Cricket. London: Aurum. 
 Major J (2007) More Than a Game: The Story of Cricket's Early Years. London: HarperCollins. 

1801 in English cricket
English cricket seasons in the 19th century